Santana de Pirapama is a municipality in the state of Minas Gerais, Brazil. In 2020, its population estimate stood at 7,589 people.

History 

Santana de Pirapama's history begun with the foundation of the district of Traíras - the name of a fish, common in that region. In 1948, Pirapama was risen to the status of municipality, independent of the town of Codisburgo.

Tradução - A história de Santana de Pirapama começou com a fundação do distrito de Traíras - o nome de um peixe, comum naquela região. Em 1948, Pirapama foi ressuscitado ao status de município, independente da cidade de Codisburgo.

The name 

Santana de Pirapama came from a union of Portuguese and Indian languages. "Santana" is a contraction of "Santa Ana", Portuguese expression referring to Saint Anne, Patron of the city. "Pirapama" came from the language of the natives, and means "furious fish", it's a characteristic of traíra, the fish whose name was used as the name of Pirapama when it was just a district of Codisburgo.

Tradução - Santana de Pirapama veio de uma união de línguas portuguesa e indiana. "Santana" é uma contração de "Santa Ana", expressão Português referindo-se a Santa Ana, Padroeira da cidade. "Pirapama" veio da língua dos nativos, e significa "peixe furioso", é uma característica de traíra, o peixe cujo nome foi usado como o nome de Pirapama quando era apenas um distrito de Codisburgo.

Culture 

In the month of July, people in Santana de Pirapama make a party to their Patron, Saint Anne. Besides Saint Anne, other saints are claimed in this party. named "Jubileu", in Portuguese, like Our Lady of the Rosary and Saint Sebastian.

Tradução - 
No mês de julho, as pessoas em Santana de Pirapama fazer uma festa para o seu Patrono, São Anne. Além de Santa Ana, outros santos são reivindicados nesta festa. chamado "Jubileu", em Português, como Nossa Senhora do Rosário e São Sebastião.

References

Municipalities in Minas Gerais
Populated places established in 1948